The 2010–11 Top League Challenge Series was the 2010–11 edition of the Top League Challenge Series, a second-tier rugby union competition in Japan, in which teams from regionalised leagues competed for promotion to the Top League for the 2011–12 season. The competition was contested from 19 December 2010 to 29 January 2011.

Honda Heat and NTT DoCoMo Red Hurricanes won promotion to the 2011–12 Top League, while Canon Eagles and Kyuden Voltex progressed to the promotion play-offs.

Competition rules and information

The top two teams from the regional Top East League, Top West League and Top Kyūshū League qualified to the Top League Challenge Series. The regional league winners participated in Challenge 1, while the runners-up participated in Challenge 2. The winner of Challenge 2 also progressed to a four-team Challenge 1.

The top two teams in Challenge 1 won automatic promotion to the 2011–12 Top League, while the third and fourth-placed teams qualified to the promotion play-offs.

Qualification

The teams qualified to the Challenge 1 and Challenge 2 series through the 2010 regional leagues.

Top West League

The final standings for the 2010 Top West League were:

 NTT DoCoMo Red Hurricanes qualified for Challenge 1.
 Honda Heat qualified for Challenge 2.
 Mitsubishi Red Evolutions were relegated to lower leagues.

Top East League

The final standings for the 2010 Top East League were:

 Canon Eagles qualified for Challenge 1.
 Tokyo Gas qualified for Challenge 2.
 JAL Wings, Secom Rugguts and Suntory Foods were relegated to lower leagues.

Top Kyūshū League

The final standings for the 2010 Top Kyūshū League were:

 Kyuden Voltex qualified for Challenge 1.
 Mazda Blue Zoomers qualified for Challenge 2.
 Kagoshima Bank and Yamagataya were relegated to lower leagues.

Challenge 1

Standings

The final standings for the 2010–11 Top League Challenge 1 were:

 Honda Heat and NTT DoCoMo Red Hurricanes won promotion to the 2011–12 Top League.
 Canon Eagles and Kyuden Voltex progressed to the promotion play-offs.

Matches

The following matches were played in the 2010–11 Top League Challenge 1:

Challenge 2

Standings

The final standings for the 2010–11 Top League Challenge 2 were:

 Honda Heat progressed to Challenge 1.

Matches

The following matches were played in the 2010–11 Top League Challenge 2:

See also

 2010–11 Top League
 Top League Challenge Series

References

2011 Challenge
2010–11 in Japanese rugby union
2011 rugby union tournaments for clubs